Jalmar Leonard Sjöberg (born March 31, 1985 in Svalöv) is an amateur Swedish Greco-Roman wrestler. He won a silver medal for the super heavyweight division at the 2009 European Wrestling Championships in Vilnius, Lithuania, and two bronze medals at the 2007 European Wrestling Championships in Sofia, Bulgaria, and at the 2009 FILA World Championships in Herning, Denmark.

Sjöberg qualified for the 120-kg category in men's Greco-Roman wrestling at the 2008 Summer Olympics in Beijing, after winning the championship title at the World Qualification Tournament in Novi Sad, Serbia. He first defeated Poland's Marek Mikulski, and Azerbaijan's Anton Botev in the first two preliminary rounds. Sjoberg eventually upset Dremiel Byers of the United States, a former champion at the 2002 World Wrestling Championships in Moscow, Russia, with a surprising tactical score of 5–2, and a classification point score of 3–1, in the quarterfinal match. Following a defeat for Byers, Sjöberg fought against, and thereby lost to Cuba's Mijaín López, who emerged as the top favorite for this category, in the semi-final match, without receiving a technical score. Sjöberg qualified for the bronze medal bout, but finished in fifth place, after being defeated by Armenia's Yuri Patrikeyev, who scored three closing points in the last period to claim a medal.

References

External links 
 Profile – SOK 
 
 NBC 2008 Olympic Profile

1985 births
Living people
Wrestlers at the 2008 Summer Olympics
Olympic wrestlers of Sweden
Swedish male sport wrestlers
World Wrestling Championships medalists
European Wrestling Championships medalists
21st-century Swedish people